HMS Cadiz was a  of the Royal Navy. She was named after the Battle of Cádiz, in which the French besieged the Spanish town in 1810, which was eventually lifted in 1812 after the French defeat at the Battle of Salamanca.

She was transferred to the Pakistan Navy in 1956, and commissioned as PNS Khaibar. She was sunk off her home port of Karachi by the Indian Navy missile boat,  during the Indo-Pakistan War of 1971.

History in the Royal Navy
Cadiz was built by Fairfield Shipbuilding and Engineering Company. She was launched on 16 September 1944 and commissioned on 12 April 1946.

Upon her commissioning, Cadiz joined the 5th Destroyer Flotilla, part of the Home Fleet. In 1947, Cadiz, along with her sister ship , escorted the aircraft carrier  to Norway, where the small group visited a variety of ports in the Scandinavian country. In 1950, Cadiz along with many other vessels of the Home Fleet, including three aircraft carriers and the battleship , undertook a Spring Cruise, visiting the Mediterranean where they performed a number of naval exercises as well as visiting a variety of ports in the region. In 1953, Cadiz took part in the Coronation Review to celebrate the Coronation of Queen Elizabeth II. In the same year, Cadiz was placed in Reserve, along with the rest of the ships in the 5th Destroyer Squadron.

History in the Pakistan Navy

On 29 February 1956 the Admiralty announced that Cadiz was being sold to the Pakistan Navy. She was refitted and modernized with funds made available by the United States Mutual Defence Assistance Programme and commissioned as PNS Khaibar. The refit was undertaken by Alex Stephens and Sons Ltd, Govan, Glasgow. She was handed over to the Pakistan Navy on the 1 February 1957.

The sinking of PNS Khaibar

During the Indo-Pakistan War of 1971, the Indian Navy launched a fast naval strike on the Pakistani Naval Headquarters of Karachi.

Nirghat launched 2 SS-N-2 Styx missiles on the largest target, which was Khaibar, 45 miles to its northwest. Both missiles struck the destroyer, sinking it. Khaibar went down with most hands on board. A Pakistani minesweeper, was also sunk and another destroyer,  was severely damaged, later scrapped as a result. The missile boats then hit the fuel storage tanks at Karachi Harbour, setting them ablaze.

Notes

Publications

Battle-class destroyers of the Royal Navy
Ships built in Govan
1944 ships
Cold War destroyers of the United Kingdom
Battle-class destroyers of the Pakistan Navy
Shipwrecks in the Arabian Sea
Maritime incidents in 1971